Jazbaa is a 2015 Indian crime thriller film directed by Sanjay Gupta. The film's narrative revolves around an attorney forced to defend an unsavory criminal after her daughter is kidnapped. It stars Aishwarya Rai and Irrfan Khan, with Shabana Azmi, Jackie Shroff, Atul Kulkarni and Chandan Roy Sanyal in supporting roles. It is a remake of the 2007 South Korean film Seven Days. The film was released on 9 October 2015 and turned out to be financially profitable. The film marked Aishwarya's return on screen after a five-year break.

Rai's performance received nominations for Best Actor in an Action Role at 2015 Big Star Entertainment Awards and in 2016, Screen Award for Best Actress (Popular Choice). She won Power-packed performance of the year at Stardust Awards.

Plot
Anuradha Verma (Aishwarya Rai) is a prominent criminal lawyer and a single mother who has never lost a case. On the day of a parent-child race organized in her daughter Sanaya's (Sara Arjun) school, Sanaya is kidnapped. The kidnapper contacts Anuradha and tells her that she has to defend a convicted felon in order to get her daughter back. Anuradha lies to family and friends, saying that Sanaya is safe at her grandmother's house, so that the law is not involved. The felon is Niyaaz Shaikh (Chandan Roy Sanyal) who is convicted for the rape and murder of a young woman named Sia (Priya Banerjee), and the case against him is set for judgement in four days. The kidnapper keeps track of Anuradha very closely to make sure that she complies with all demands. All evidence suggests that Niyaaz is the murderer, and so Anuradha has to work hard to win the case, and with time running out, she tries to get help from her police friend Yohan (Irrfan Khan), who has been suspended from the police force by other corrupt officers for flouting the rules and regulations too often.

The case against Niyaaz is being closely monitored by powerful politician Mahesh Maklai (Jackie Shroff). Mahesh asks renowned public prosecutor (Atul Kulkarni), who has been defeated by Anuradha in the past, to take up the case as rape is a critical issue the current government is fighting. Anuradha tries to gather information by hook or crook, including lying to Sia's mother Garima Chaudhary (Shabana Azmi). Anuradha discovers that Mahesh's son, Sam (Siddhanth Kapoor), was Sia's boyfriend, and Niyaaz was their drug dealer. Niyaaz had raped and killed Sia after delivering drugs to her home, during which time Sam was intoxicated and passed out.

As Anuradha returns home one evening, she is taken hostage by Mahesh Maklai and his henchmen. The politician explains to her that Sam panicked and contacted him to help him dispose of Sia's corpse. Cutting the gas pipes and planning to set the home on fire, the home intruders leave Anuradha bound and gagged on the floor. However she unties herself and escapes.

After returning to court, Anuradha is able to get Niyaaz out on bail due to lack of evidence and also implicates Mahesh and Sam as co-conspirators of the murder, thus destroying the political career of Mahesh. Sanaya is freed by the kidnapper. As Yohan and Anuradha continue digging, they realise that Garima is behind the kidnapping of her daughter. Garima forced Anuradha to defend Niyaaz, so that he could be freed. Garima then kidnapped Niyaaz and burned him alive, since she finds the death sentence or life imprisonment to be insufficient punishment for someone who brutally raped and murdered her daughter. Anuradha, though initially infuriated after finding out the truth, offers her services as a lawyer to Garima after she is apprehended by police.

Cast
 Aishwarya Rai as Advocate Anuradha Verma
 Irrfan Khan as Inspector Yohan
 Sara Arjun as Sanaya Verma, Anuradha's daughter
 Shabana Azmi as Garima Chowdhury, Sia's mother
 Jackie Shroff as MP and Home Minister Mahesh Maklai, Sam's father
 Chandan Roy Sanyal as Niyaaz Shaikh, Sia's murderer
 Atul Kulkarni as Prosecution Lawyer Ronit
 Siddhanth Kapoor as Sam Maklai, Mahesh's son
 Priya Banerjee as Sia Chowdhury, Garima's daughter
 Abhimanyu Singh as Abbas Yusuf, Anuradha's client
 Taran Bajaj as Sunny Locksmith
 Rajat Kaul as Benny
 Dadhi Raj as Parmar
 Ankur Vikal as Vijay
 Pramod Pathak as Satnam Singh
 Sangeeta Kanhayat as Nazia Qureshi, wife of Niyaaz
 Kaizaad Kotwal as Dr Satish
 Rajiv Kachroo as Joe
 Sukaniya as Warden Amrita
 Shilpa Mehta as Sulekha Tai, maid servant
 Diksha Kaushal as an item number "Aaj Raat Ka Scene"

Production
According to reports John Abraham was supposed to play the male lead in the film. However the film-maker Sanjay Gupta dismissed the rumors and said "John was never cast for the role". Irrfan Khan was signed to star opposite Aishwarya and Shabana Azmi, Jackie Shroff, Atul Kulkarni and Chandan Roy Sanyal were confirmed as a part of the film's supporting cast.

Aishwarya did prepare to portray a lawyer in the film. She met lawyers and even went through various court case clippings to get the nuances of her character right. Filming began in January 2015, and the film was shot in and around Mumbai. The shooting of the film was completed in 51 days.

Pre-release revenue

Soundtrack

The first promotional song of the film titled "Bandeyaa" was released on 7 September 2015. The music is composed by Amjad-Nadeem, Arko and Badshah. The full audio album released on 1 October 2015 by Zee Music Company.

Reception

Critical reception
Meena Iyer of The Times of India gave the film 3.5 out of 5 stars and stated "Jazbaa's narrative has pace and power. Aishwarya is rusty at the start but eventually takes charge of the dual aspects of her character. Once in the groove, her eyes breathe fire. Irrfan breezes past with clap-trap Kamlesh Pandey dialogues and Shabana is flawless."
Daily News and Analysis rated the film with 3.5 stars out of 5 and commented "What makes Jazbaa a satisfying experience is it's fast-paced, taut and has a run time of two hours, allowing you little time to think. The court-room scenes are brilliant, Aishwarya looks gorgeous and gutted as the scene requires her to be, but it is the supporting cast who lift the film several notches above." Zee News gave a rating of 3.5 stars out of 5 noted "Overall, 'Jazbaa' is compelling and an ensemble that lived up-to its expectation. For Aishwarya –The age-appropriate role was pulled off impeccably and she also showed a few action stunts".
Sonia Chopra from Sify gave the film 3.5 out of 5 stars and noted "Despite the story being highly far-fetched, the film is still arresting for its pacy storytelling, actors who perform with conviction, and a few interesting surprises in the finale. Worth a watch!." Filmfare rated 3 stars out of 5, praised the performances of all the actors and noted "The film steams up some good thrills and then throws a bucket full of sentimentality over them and douses them out. Aishwarya performance as a confident lawyer but vulnerable mother is fantastic." The Guardian also gave the film 3 stars, and mentioned "For all the rot Gupta dwells on, there's something refreshing about Jazbaa within the wider Bollywood context: it'll make for brisk, pacy, adult entertainment."

Bollywood Hungama gave it 3 stars, stating "Aishwarya Rai Bachchan with her 'initially-rusty-later spellbinding' performance, carries the film on her shoulders. On the whole, JAZBAA is a captivating thriller with good performances that make it a decent one-time watch." Mid-Day rated 3 stars and noted "Sanjay Gupta had gone a little easy on the unnecessary and intrusive melodrama. Even then, it's a good one time watch for sure. Aishwarya Rai Bachchan perfectly looks the part and even does a fairly decent job, barring certain emotional scenes where she clearly goes over the top." Writing for Hindustan Times, Rohit Vats gave a rating of 3 stated, "The film is a well paced thriller, but primary characters' penchant for invoking whistles dilutes the thrill to some extent. Aishwarya Rai and Irrfan will take you to a new territory and then keep you there for most of its 130-minute duration. Jazbaa is a good watch this weekend." Gayatri Gauri from Firstpost said "The screenplay moves fast in a gripping enough thriller mode. Gupta displays his old penchant for slick action and weaves a fairly engrossing tale." IANS gave the film 3.5 stars commented that "With ample thrill and entertainment, this one is a good weekend watch. Aishwarya, seen on screen after a long hiatus, has a pivotal role, which she dons to perfection. However, the picture-perfect designing of the film is over-egged, giving the film a glossy, albeit, synthetic and unreal look." Subhash K. Jha said that "It's a hardhitting unconstitutional message, packaged and projected with a precarious panache peculiar to Sanjay Gupta's cinema. The shared moments between Aishwarya and Shabana Azmi are a marvel to behold."

On the contrary, Shomini Sen from CNN-IBN criticised the film for its melodramatic, high pitched and unintentionally funny dialogues and wrote "Jazbaa scores only because of the performances. Aishwarya Rai grunts and screeches on some scenes but manages to deliver a convincing performance." Ananya Bhattacharya writing for India Today gave 2.5 stars criticized Gupta's direction and wrote "The problem with Jazbaa lies in the overdose of melodrama and dialogues that make your ears bleed. One aspect that works in favour of the film is Jazbaa does raise some pertinent questions about the way justice is (un)delivered in the country. Watch Jazbaa for the performances." The Koimoi reviewer, Surabhi Redkar rated 2.5 stars out of 5 said "Jazbaa does not promise anything extraordinary. If you have missed Aishwarya Rai Bachchan in films, here is a treat for you. Irrfan Khan fans will certainly enjoy." Saibal Chatterjee from NDTV gave the film 2.5 out of 5 stars and stated "Jazbaa is a slick production all right and it does deliver a few thrilling moments and an above-average climax. Overall, Jazbaa feels like a wasted effort, a clear case of superficial style triumphing over substance by a fair distance. But it has just enough for Aishwarya Rai Bachchan fans to justify a trip to the multiplexes." Sukanya Verma of Rediff gave 2 stars and described the film as "A mostly watchable thriller marred by its director Sanjay Gupta's penchant for excesses."

Box office
The film collected  nett on its first day.
The first weekend collection stand at  nett. On its first Monday the film collected  nett. At the end of first week, the film collected  nett. The film performed fairly average on its second weekend at the domestic box office with the total 10-day collection stands at  nett.

The film collected  nett in its second week to take its two weeks total to  nett.

Koimoi reported that the film has turned out to be a profitable venture after its one-week run.

In its lifetime, Jazbaa grossed between 33.19– 429 million.

References

External links 
 

2015 films
2015 crime thriller films
2010s Hindi-language films
Films about child abduction in India
Indian remakes of South Korean films
Indian crime thriller films
Indian films about revenge
Films directed by Sanjay Gupta